Lake Township is a township in Clay County, Iowa, USA.  As of the 2000 census, its population was 240.

History
Lake Township was created in 1882. It is named from the large number of lakes within its borders.

Geography

Dan Green Slough, Mud Lake, Round Lake and Trumbull Lake are within this township.

Notes

References
 USGS Geographic Names Information System (GNIS)

External links
 US-Counties.com
 City-Data.com

Townships in Clay County, Iowa
Townships in Iowa